Geyik Alanı Grove is a pine grove in Eskişehir Province, western Turkey. "Geyik Alanı" means "Deer Field". The area is a registered natural monument of the country.

The trees are at straight and well-rounded stand. The area was registered a natural monument on November 3, 2000.

References

Natural monuments of Turkey
Forests of Turkey
Geography of Eskişehir Province
Protected areas established in 2000
2000 establishments in Turkey